The ICF Canoe Sprint World Cup is an annual series of races in canoe sprint and one of Canoe World Cup that held under the auspices of the International Canoe Federation. The winning country is determined based on the total scores of all events at all stages (plus World Championship scores). In the Olympic years, only the sum of the World Cup points is calculated.

World Cup Series

Canoe sprint

Para Canoe Sprint 
Para Canoe sprint World Cup was started since 2015 (2016 not held).

Results 
2021 Results:

 https://results.szeged2021.com/results/competition/1/races
 http://results.imas-sport.com/imas/regatta.php?competition=wettkampf_238
 https://www.the-sports.org/canoeing-world-cup-flat-water-2021-medals-epa113736.html
 https://www.the-sports.org/canoeing-paracanoe-world-cup-results-2021-women-epf113739.html
 https://www.the-sports.org/canoeing-paracanoe-world-cup-results-2021-men-epm113739.html#503452#503452

See also 
 ICF Canoe Sprint World Championships
 Canoeing at the Summer Olympics
 Canoe World Cup
 Rowing World Cup
 Sailing World Cup

References

External links  
 International Canoe Federation

Canoeing and kayaking competitions
Canoeing
Canoe sprint